Pasumarru is a village in PalnaduGuntur district of the Indian state of Andhra Pradesh. It is the headquarters of Chilakaluripet mandal in Narasaraopet revenue division.

Geography 
Pasumarru is situated to the southeast of the mandal headquarters, Purushothapatnam,

Governance 

Pasumarru gram panchayat is the local self-government of the village. It is divided into wards and each ward is represented by a ward member.

Education 

As per the school information report for the academic year 2018–19, the village has a total of 6 schools. These schools include 1 private and 5 Zilla/Mandal Parishad schools.

References 

Villages in Palnadu district